The 1983 Virginia Slims of Utah, also known as the Ginny of Utah, was a women's tennis tournament played on outdoor hard courts at the Canyon Racquet Club in Salt Lake City, Utah, in the United States that was part of the Ginny Tournament Circuit of the 1983 Virginia Slims World Championship Series. It was the second edition of the tournament and was held from September 12 to 17, 1983. First-seeded Yvonne Vermaak won the singles title and earned $7,000 first-prize money.

Finals

Singles
 Yvonne Vermaak defeated  Felica Raschiatore 6–2, 0–6, 7–5
 It was Vermaak's 3rd title of the year and the 4th of her career.

Doubles
 Cláudia Monteiro /  Yvonne Vermaak defeated  Amanda Brown /  Brenda Remilton 6–1, 3–6, 6–4
 It was Monteiro's 1st title of the year and the 3rd of her career. It was Vermaak's 2nd title of the year and the 3rd of her career.

Notes

References

External links
 ITF tournament edition details

Virginia Slims of Utah
Virginia Slims of Utah
Virginia Slims of Utah
Virginia Slims of Utah
Virginia Slims of Utah